Tamir Cohen (born 4 March 1984) is an Israeli former professional footballer who played as a midfielder. He is the son of the late Maccabi Tel Aviv and Liverpool player Avi Cohen.

Club career

Early career
Cohen was born in Tel Aviv, Israel, to a family of both Sephardi Jewish (Italian-Jewish, Egyptian-Jewish) and Mizrahi Jewish (Egyptian-Jewish) descent.

He started his career in Maccabi Tel Aviv's youth team where in 2001–02 he won the double. His first game in the Israeli Premier League was in November 2002 during Maccabi's 1–0 win over Bnei Yehuda Tel Aviv, when he came on as a substitute. He scored his first goal against Maccabi Petah Tikva in a 2–1 in the Toto Cup, where he scored the winning goal.

On 11 January 2007 Cohen moved to Maccabi Netanya.

Bolton Wanderers
On 1 January 2008, Cohen transferred to English club Bolton Wanderers for a fee of £39,000. He made his Bolton debut in the 1–0 FA Cup defeat to Sheffield United, wearing the squad number 25, previously occupied by Abdoulaye Faye. His first Premiership goal was scored on 2 March 2008 in a match against his father's former club Liverpool at the Reebok stadium, which ended in a 3–1 win for Liverpool.  The 25-year-old made 11 appearances in his first season in English football.

In the 2008–09 campaign, Cohen played a peripheral role for Bolton Wanderers this campaign with a longstanding thigh injury keeping him out of action for over five months. The Israeli man eventually returned to the first team fold in the final couple of months of the season, earning his first start against Aston Villa at the Reebok Stadium on 25 April. Cohen stole all the headlines with a vibrant midfield performance and capped off the afternoon with a neatly taken equaliser to earn Bolton a vital point. He celebrated his goal by saluting his friends and family who were sat in the West Stand after he had been handed a 'lucky shekel' to put down his sock. Cohen expressed hope that his injury problems would be behind him and that Wanderers fans would see more of his footballing talents in the 2009–10, saying "It's been very frustrating because it's not easy for a football player to be injured. But that is football and you need to live with that. Now hopefully I won't be out anymore while I'm with Bolton".

Cohen was released by Bolton Wanderers at the end of the 2010–11 season, after three and a half years at the club.

Maccabi Haifa
On 8 August 2011, Cohen signed a four-year deal with Israeli Maccabi Haifa. He rejected an offer from Greek side Panathinaikos in order to play in Israel where he can be closer to his family. Tamir earned €300,000, the highest salary in Maccabi Haifa.

International career
Cohen made seven appearances for the Israel under-21 national al team. His first appearance on the U-21 team was on the losing side to Cyprus.

He played for the Israel national team against Croatia on 13 October 2007.

Personal life
Cohen holds an Italian passport in addition to his Israeli citizenship owing to his Italian-Jewish (Sephardi Jewish) ancestry. His citizenship of a European Union country gives him the option of playing for an EU football club without having to be classified as a foreigner.

He is the son of Maccabi Tel Aviv and Liverpool player Avi Cohen. Following his father's ultimately fatal motorcycle accident in December 2010, he flew to Israel to be at his father's bedside. On 24 April 2011, Cohen emotionally celebrated by taking off his shirt to reveal a picture of his father after scoring the winning goal in Bolton's 2–1 victory over Arsenal.

Cohen is also the nephew of the former Israeli association football player Vicky Peretz and the cousin of Peretz's sons, Adi Peretz and Omer Peretz.

Career statistics

Honours
Maccabi Tel Aviv
Israeli Premier League: 2002–03
Israel State Cup: 2004–05

See also
List of Israelis
List of Jewish footballers
List of select Jewish football (association; soccer) players

References

External links

1984 births
Living people
Israeli Jews
Israeli footballers
Jewish footballers
Association football midfielders
Israel international footballers
Israel under-21 international footballers
Maccabi Tel Aviv F.C. players
Maccabi Netanya F.C. players
Maccabi Haifa F.C. players
Hapoel Ra'anana A.F.C. players
Bolton Wanderers F.C. players
Israeli expatriate footballers
Expatriate footballers in England
Israeli expatriate sportspeople in England
Israeli Premier League players
Premier League players
Israeli people of Egyptian-Jewish descent
Israeli people of Italian-Jewish descent
Footballers from Tel Aviv
Cateogry:Sephardic Jews
Cateogry:Mizrahi Jews